This was the first edition of the tournament.

Donati and Napolitano won the title, defeating Pierre-Hugues Herbert and Albano Olivetti in the final, 7–6(7–2), 6–3.

Seeds

Draw

Draw

References
 Main Draw

2014 ATP Challenger Tour
2014 Doubles